Fred Lyssa (1883–1950) was a German film producer and production manager.

Selected filmography
 D III 88 (1928)
 The Devious Path (1928)
 A Girl with Temperament (1928)
 The Night of Terror (1929)
 The Hound of the Baskervilles (1929)
 The Dancer of Sanssouci (1932)
 Pillars of Society (1935)
 Stjenka Rasin (1936)
 Ball at the Metropol (1937)
 Shadows Over St. Pauli (1938)
 A Gust of Wind (1942)
 Paracelsus (1943)
 A Man Like Maximilian (1945)
 The Millionaire (1947)

References

Bibliography 
 Nicolella, Henry. Frank Wisbar: The Director of Ferryman Maria, from Germany to America and Back. McFarland, 2018.

External links 
 

1883 births
1950 deaths
Film people from Berlin
German film producers